Catoptria spatulelloides is a species of moth in the family Crambidae. It is found in Italy.

References

Moths described in 1965
Crambini
Endemic fauna of Italy
Moths of Europe